An approach to nonlinear congruential methods of generating uniform pseudorandom numbers in the interval [0,1) is the Inversive congruential generator with prime modulus. A generalization for arbitrary composite moduli  with arbitrary distinct primes    will be present here.

Let .

 
 

where  denotes the number of positive integers less than m which are relatively prime to m.

Example

Hence   and the sequence   is not maximum.

The result below shows that these sequences are closely related to the following inversive congruential sequence  with prime moduli.

For  let    and   be integers with

 

Theorem 1

Let  for   be defined as above.
Then           
 

This theorem shows that an implementation of Generalized Inversive Congruential Generator is possible, where exact integer computations have to be performed only in   but not in  

Proof:

Then straightforward calculations and Fermat's Theorem yield

 ,
which implies the desired result.

Generalized Inversive Congruential Pseudorandom Numbers are well equidistributed in one dimension. A reliable theoretical approach for assessing their statistical independence properties is based on the discrepancy of s-tuples of pseudorandom numbers.

Discrepancy bounds of the GIC Generator

Higher bound
Let 
Then the discrepancy  satisfies
  <       for any Generalized Inversive Congruential operator.

Lower bound:

There exist Generalized Inversive Congruential Generators  with
     :  for all dimension s  2.

For a fixed number r of prime factors of m, Theorem 2 shows that 
for any Generalized Inversive Congruential Sequence. In this case Theorem 3 implies that there exist Generalized Inversive Congruential Generators  having a discrepancy  which is at least of the order of magnitude  for all dimension . However, if m is composed only of small primes, then r can be of an order of magnitude  and hence  for every . Therefore, one obtains in the general case  for every .

Since , similar arguments imply that in the general case the lower bound in Theorem 3 is at least of the order of magnitude 
 for  every . It is this range of magnitudes where one also finds the discrepancy of m independent and uniformly distributed random points which almost always has the order of magnitude 
 
according to the law of the iterated logarithm for discrepancies. In this sense, Generalized Inversive Congruential Pseudo-random Numbers model true random numbers very closely.

See also
Pseudorandom number generator
List of random number generators
Linear congruential generator
Inversive congruential generator
Naor-Reingold Pseudorandom Function

References

Notes

Pseudorandom number generators